Jinzhousaurus is a genus of hadrosauroid dinosaur of the Early Cretaceous of China. The type species is Jinzhousaurus yangi. The generic name refers to the town Jinzhou. The specific name honours Yang Zhongjian as the founder of Chinese paleontology. It was first described by Wang Xiao-lin and Xu Xing in 2001.

Discovery
 
Its fossil, holotype IVPP V12691, was found near Baicaigou in Yixian County in the Dawangzhangzi Beds of the Yixian Formation in Liaoning, China, having an oldest determinable age of 122 million years, during the early Aptian stage of the early Cretaceous Period. It consists of a nearly complete skeleton, compressed on a slab.

Description
Jinzhousaurus has a length of about 7 metres (23 ft) and its skull is about half a metre long. Its snout was elongated with large nares and lacking an antorbital fenestra. The back of the skull was uncommonly wide with a small crest on top. The dentary of the lower jaw has at least seventeen tooth positions.

Classification
Jinzhousaurus shows a mix of basal and derived features. Originally assigned to (an already understood to be paraphyletic) Iguanodontidae, later authors have referred it to the more general Iguanodontoidea. In 2010 a study concluded it was within this group a basal member of the more derived, Hadrosauroidea.

References

External links 
 Jinzhousaurus in The Natural History Museum's Dino Directory

Iguanodonts
Early Cretaceous dinosaurs of Asia
Aptian life
Cretaceous China
Fossils of China
Yixian fauna
Fossil taxa described in 2001
Taxa named by Xu Xing
Ornithischian genera